SsingSsing (Hangul: 씽씽) was a South Korean band that fused Korean folk music with genres including glam rock, disco, and psychedelic rock. The band formed in 2010, and gained international attention in 2017 after performing on NPR’s Tiny Desk Concerts and at Globalfest at Webster Hall. The band's six members include traditional singer Lee Hee-moon and music director Jang Young-gyu. SsingSsing ended in October, 2018 and Lee Hee-moon has said "But it is a project band that has disbanded. I loved being a part of it, but as of now, I do not have a plan to do it again."

Members 
 Lee Hee-moon (vocals)
 Jang Young-gyu (music director, bass guitar)
 Choo Da-hye (vocals) 
 Shin Seung-tae (vocals) 
 Lee Chul-hee (drums)
 Lee Tae-won (electric guitar)

Discography

Extended plays

Artistry

Visual presentation 
The band describes their style as “authentic Korean traditional vocals with rock band music, combined with an extravagant visual style and stage manners.” 

SsingSsing’s performances often feature elaborate costuming and accessories. The singers dress in drag to reinterpret old Korean traditions, in what The New York Times describes as an “irreverent but intriguing hybrid.” Music critics Anastasia Tsioulcas and Bob Boilen in NPR’s All Songs Considered describe SsingSsing as “very glam, very rock and roll and very ready to play with the concept of gender. Because male shamans in Korean traditional art need to channel male and female spirits, the men in the band cross-dress.”

Vocalist Hee-moon Lee has elaborated on SsingSsing's trademark appearance, noting that the drag elements are more than just cosmetic styling:

“In Korean traditional art, male shamans, called baksu, have the body of a male. But as mediums, they need more than a single sexual identity, because they're channeling both male and female spirits. When I act a female character and sing, I have to overcome the fact of my being a male sorikkun (singer), and try my utmost to bring a more neutral, unisex feeling to the performance".

Musical style 
One of the folk styles that SsingSsing incorporates into their sound includes Gyeonggi Sori, which originates from the central province around Seoul. Gyeonggi Sori is recognized as one of the important Intangible Cultural Assets of Korea (Asset #57). Other styles present in their music are Seodo Sori (which originates from the northwest provinces of North Korea), Hwanghae/Pyeongan folk songs, and the shamanistic-ritual based Seoul Gut.

Heewon Kim calls attention to the rural elements of SsingSsing's use of folk Minyo style: “we can try to define the band’s genre as alternative Minyo rock. Minyo, which refers to Korean folk music, is characterized by its emphasis on strong vocal lines and lyrics that sing about peasant lives.”

The Ministry of Foreign Affairs of Korea notes that “in a fast-growing society where people tend to stray away from traditional rituals, SsingSsing brings them back in touch with the cultural roots of Korea through a very playful style, accessible for 21st century urban citizens.” SsingSsing has also received accolades for bringing a different style of Korean music to global audiences beyond the typical K-Pop exports.

References 

South Korean musical groups